Republican Alternative may refer to:

 Republican Alternative Party (Azerbaijan), Azerbaijani political party.
 Republican Alternative (Spain), Spanish political party.